Tangsa, also known as Tase and Tase Naga, is a Sino-Tibetan language or language cluster spoken by the Tangsa people of Burma and north-eastern India. Some varieties, such as Shangge, are likely distinct languages. There are about 60,000 speakers in Burma and 40,000 speakers in India.

Geographical distribution
Tangsa is spoken in the following locations of Myanmar:

Hkamti District, Sagaing Division: Nanyun, Pangsau, Lahe, and Hkamti townships
Myitkyina District, Kachin State: Shinbwiyan and Tanai townships

In India, Tangsa is spoken in Arunachal Pradesh and Assam. Below are locations for some varieties of Tangsa.

Jugli: Kantang, Longlung, and Rangran villages, central Tirap District, Arunachal (Rekhung 1988)
Lungchang: Changlang, Rangkatu, and Kengkhu villages, eastern Tirap District, Arunachal (Rekhung 1988)
Tutsa: Sabban area, Changlang Subdivision, western Changlang District (also in southeastern Tirap District), Arunachal (Rekhung 1992)
Chamchang (Kimsing):Nongtham, Jotinkaikhe, Kharsang, Songking, Injan of Miao Sub-division and Nampong-Jairampur-Nampong sub-division of Changlang district. Chamchang dialect is adopted as lingua-franca by many sub-tribes in Sagaing Division of Myanmar. In India, Nagamese or Nefamese are typically used as a lingua-franca. The first complete Bible of the Tangsas has been translated in Chamchang(Kimsing) by the Bible Society of India.
Mossang:Neotan Village,Old Plone,New Plone,Songking,Namphainong, Nayang village, Miao area & Theremkan village, Nampong circle, Changlang District, Arunachal (Rekhung 1999)

Ethnologue also lists the following languages:
Lao Naga (Law, Loh) (ISO 639 nlq): 1,000 speakers (as of 2012) in Lahe Township. Most similar to Chen-Kayu Naga and the Chuyo and Gakat dialects of Tase Naga.
Chen-Kayu Naga (Kyan-Karyaw Naga) (ISO 639 nqq): 9,000 speakers (as of 2012) in 13 villages of Lahe Township. Dialects are Chen (Kyan) and Kayu (Kahyu, Kaiyaw, Karyaw, Kayaw). Most similar to the Chuyo and Gakat dialects of Tase Naga.

Dialects
There are four principal varieties, 
 Muklom
 Pangwa Naga
 Ponthai
 Tikhak

Morey (2017)
Within Tangsa, the Pangwa group has about 20 subgroups in India. The Pangwa had migrated from Myanmar to India in the 20th century (Morey 2017). Pangwa subgroups are listed below, with autonyms listed in parentheses, where superscript digits are language-specific tone-marks.

The Tikhak group consists of:
Longchang
Tikhak
Nokjah
Yongkuk
Kato (currently extinct)

Other subgroups that do not belong to either the Pangwa or Tikhak groups are:
Moklum
Ponthai (Nukta)
Havi (Hawoi)
Hakhun (haˀkʰun)
Thamphang (ʨampaŋ, Champang)
Thamkok (Chamkok)
Halang (Hehle)

Besides Pangwa and Tikhak, other Tangsa groups are:
Muklom (Muklom, Hawoi)
Phong (also known as Ponthai)

Lann (2018)
Lann (2018:8) classifies the Tangsa language varieties as follows, and recognizes 11 subgroups. IPA transcriptions for dialect names are also provided (Lann 2018:4-6), where superscript digits are language-specific tone-marks.
Upland Pangva: Shecyü (ɕe².ȶɯ²), Chamchang (ȶəm².ȶəŋ²), Mungre (muŋ².ɹe²), Mueshaungx (mɯ³.ɕaoŋ³), Lochang (lo³.ȶʰaŋ³), Haqcyeng (haʔ.ȶeŋ²), Ngaimong (ŋaj².moŋ²), Shangvan (ɕəŋ².van²), Joglei (juk.li²), Cholim (ȶo².lim²), Longri (loŋ³.ɹi²), Jöngi (dʒɵ².ŋi³), Maitai (maj³.taj³)
Eastern Pangva
Eastern Pangva A: Lungkhi (luŋ².kʰi³), Khalak (kʰ.lək), Gachai (ɡ.ȶʰaj²)
Eastern Pangva B: Rinkhu (ɹin².kʰu²), Näkkhi (nək.kʰi²), Rasi (ɹa².si²), Rasa (ɹa².sa²), Rera (ɹe².ɹa²), Kochung (ko².ȶʰuŋ²), Shokra (ɕok.ɹa²), Shangthi (ɕəŋ².tʰi²), Shanchin (ɕan².ȶʰin²), Khangchin, Khangdu, Lawnyung (lon².juŋ²), Yangbaivang (jəŋ².ban².vəŋ²), Gaqha (ɡaʔ.ha²), Raraq (ɹa².ɹaʔ), Raqnu (ɹaʔ.nu²), Kotlum (kot.lum²), Assen (a.sen²), Hasa (ha².sa³)
Yungkuk-Tikhak: Yungkuk (joŋ².kuk), Tikhak (ti².kʰak), Longchang (loŋ³.ȶaŋ²), Muklum (mok.lum²), Havi (ha².vi), Kato (ka².to³), Nukyaq
Ole: Nahen (na³.hen³), Lumnu (lum².nu³), Yangno (jɐŋ².no³), Kumgaq, Haqpo (haʔ.po²), Chamkok (ȶəm².kok), Champang (ȶəm².pəŋ²), Haqcyum (haʔ.ȶum), Tawke (to².ke³), Hokuq (ho³.kuʔ)
Kon-Pingnan: Yongkon (kon³), Chawang, Nukvuk, Miku (mi².ku²), Pingku (piŋ².ku²), Nansa (nan³.sa³, Nyinshao)
Haqte: Haqkhii (haʔ.kʰɤ²), Haqman (haʔ.man²), Bote (bo.te²), Lama (ku³.ku²), Haqkhun (haʔ.kʰun²), Nocte (nok.te²), Phong (pʰoŋ, Ponthai), Tutsa (tup.sa³)
Olo: Haqsik (haʔ.tsik), Lajo (la².jo²)
Ola: Kaishan (kaj².ɕan³)
Sandzik (san².ðik)
Cyokat: Chuyo (ȶu³.jo²), Gaqkat (ɡ.kaʔ), Wancho (vən³.ȶo²)
Kunyon: Kuku (ku³.ku²), Makyam (poŋ².ɲon³, Pongnyuan)

Lann (2018:4) lists the Aktung, Angsü-Angsa, Giiyii, Gawngkaq, Khangcyu, Khangdo, Kumgaq, Punlam, Nukyaq, and Vangtak-Vangkaq dialects as being extinct or nearly extinct.

Orthography

In 1990, Mr. Lakhum Mossang from Namphai Nong, Arunachal Pradesh in India created an alphabet for the Tangsa language. He taught the alphabet in public events and festivals, and promoted the script with community organisations and schools. In 2021, there were about 100 people who are using the script. The Tangsa Script Development Committee was founded in 2019 and continues development of the script after the passing of Lakhum Mossang in order ensure accommodation to the wide range of Tangsa varieties spoken in the region. The script has not yet gained widespread adoption.

Beyond the use of Lakhum Mossang's script, Tangsa varieties are generally written in the Latin alphabet with multiple different spelling conventions in use. One such Roman orthography is that for Mossang, designed by Reverend Gam Win and used in the Mossang translation of the Bible. Different Roman orthographies are in use among different subtribes, often with considerable variation. These differences tend to follow Christian denominational divisions.

The Gam Win Romanization for Mossang is as follows:

Tonal vowels 
Each vowel of the Tangsa alphabet notes a combination representing one of 11 phonemic base vowels:

modified by one of four distinctive vocalic tones (noted in Latin transcriptions by trailing consonnants appended after the base vowel):

As well, the Tangsa alphabet includes a few additional separate letters for distinctive tonal vowels  :

Consonants 
Unlike Brahmic-derived abugidas most often used for languages in India and Burma, the 31 consonants of the Tangsa alphabet (used to write Sino-Tibetan languages and not Brahmic-based languages) don't carry any inherent vowel:

Unicode 

The Tangsa alphabet was added to the Unicode Standard in September, 2021 with the release of version 14.0.

The Unicode block for Tangsa is U+16A70–U+16ACF. The 48 base vowels (with tones) are encoded in U+16A70–U+16A9F, the 31 base consonants are encoded in U+16AA0–U+16ABE, and ten decimal digits are encoded in U+16AC0–U+16AC9:

References

External links
Tai and Tibeto-Burman Languages of Assam (SEAlang.net)
Chamchang (Kimsing) online dictionary (SEAlang.net)
Cholim (Tonglum) online dictionary (SEAlang.net)
Joglei (Yugli) online dictionary (SEAlang.net)
Mueshaungx (Mossang) online dictionary (SEAlang.net)
Classifying Konyak and other Naga languages
A Unicode chart about the Tangsa alphabet
Another Unicode chart about the Tangsa alphabet
Tangsa at Omniglot

Languages of Assam
Languages of Arunachal Pradesh
Sal languages
Endangered languages of India
Languages of Myanmar